Klausbach may refer to:

 Klausbach (Ramsau), a river of Bavaria, Germany, main headwater of the Ramsauer Ache
 Klausbach (Salzach), a river of Salzburg, Austria, tributary of the Salzach